Ava Bill Martin Memorial Airport  is a city-owned, public-use airport located two nautical miles (4 km) northwest of the central business district of Ava, a city in Douglas County, Missouri, United States.

Although many U.S. airports use the same three-letter location identifier for the FAA and IATA, this airport is assigned AOV by the FAA but has no designation from the IATA.

Facilities and aircraft 
Ava Bill Martin Memorial Airport covers an area of 62 acres (25 ha) at an elevation of 1,311 feet (400 m) above mean sea level. It has one runway designated 13/31 with an asphalt surface measuring 3,634 by 50 feet (1,108 x 15 m).

For the 12-month period ending March 31, 2010, the airport had 1,270 aircraft operations, an average of 105 per month: 98% general aviation and 2% military. At that time there were five aircraft based at this airport: 80% single-engine and 20% ultralight.

References

External links 
 Ava Bill Martin Memorial (AOV) at MoDOT Airport Directory
 Aerial image as of March 1995 from USGS The National Map
 
 

Airports in Missouri
Douglas County, Missouri